Helmut Fiehn (19 February 1916 – 23 April 1943) was a Kapitänleutnant (captain lieutenant) in Nazi Germany's Kriegsmarine during World War II.

He was born on 19 February 1916 in Königsberg, Germany. In 1935 he joined the German military as a trainee in the Luftwaffe, where he rose to the rank of Oberleutnant in 1939. At the outbreak of the war, Fiehn transferred to the Kriegsmarine where he was given the rank of Kapitänleutnant and awarded the Iron Cross 2nd Class.

Helmut Fiehn is the older brother of former German journalist John Fiehn, who is known for being the first journalist to report the construction of the Berlin Wall during the Cold War.

References

Bibliography

External links

1916 births
1943 deaths
Recipients of the Iron Cross (1939), 2nd class
People lost at sea
Kriegsmarine personnel killed in World War II
People from Chojna
U-boat commanders (Kriegsmarine)
Luftwaffe personnel